Great Northern Railway 1355 is a standard gauge steam railway locomotive built by Baldwin Locomotive Works in 1909 for the Great Northern Railway in the United States. It was built as a 4-6-0, Ten-Wheeler, type, but it had an extensive rebuild in 1924 when it became a 4-6-2, Pacific, type. During its career, it pulled both freight and passenger trains, including the Great Northern's crack Empire Builder and Oriental Limited.

It was built as one of 25 class E14 Ten-Wheelers and passed its inspections at the GN's Dale Street Shops in St. Paul, Minnesota on November 19, 1909.  It spent its first ten years near Hillyard, Washington and then in 1919, was sent to Spokane, both in passenger service.

On February 19, 1924, it returned to the Dale Street Shops for a major rebuild.  It's not clear whether this was actually a rebuild or virtually a new engine.  New parts included a Belpaire firebox, longer boiler, type A superheater, new solid leading wheels, a Delta trailing truck which made it a 4-6-2, new brakes, and one of its four conversions between oil and coal fuel. It left the shop on May 29 and was sent to the Willmar, Minnesota division for passenger work.

The following January, it was back in the shop to receive a booster engine on its trailing truck.  This was removed in 1929.  It was renumbered again, to 1355, in April 1926 and converted from coal to oil. It was then dispatched to the Butte, Montana division, where it principally handled the Oriental Limited.  It spent the last two years of its working life, 1953–55, hauling iron ore on the Mesabi Range until its retirement in 1955.

In late 1954, the city of Sioux City, Iowa asked the Great Northern for a steam locomotive. Sioux City was at very southern end of the GN's operations and in July, 1955, 1355 was delivered to the city. In 1995, the locomotive was moved to the former Milwaukee Road Shops and Roundhouse, where it has undergone extensive cosmetic restoration.

It was added to the National Register of Historic Places in 2004 as Great Northern Railway Steam Locomotive No. 1355 and Tender 1451.

References

Great Northern Railway (U.S.)
Railway locomotives introduced in 1909
Railway locomotives on the National Register of Historic Places
4-6-2 locomotives
4-6-0 locomotives
Baldwin locomotives
Passenger locomotives
Individual locomotives of the United States
1355
National Register of Historic Places in Sioux City, Iowa
Woodbury County, Iowa
Rail transportation on the National Register of Historic Places in Iowa
Preserved steam locomotives of Iowa